The Jubilee Medal "In Commemoration of the 100th Anniversary of the Birth of Vladimir Ilyich Lenin" was a state commemorative medal of the Soviet Union established by decree of the Presidium of the Supreme Soviet on November 5, 1969 to commemorate the 100th anniversary of the birth of Vladimir Lenin.  Its statute was amended on July 18, 1980, by decree of the Presidium of the Supreme Soviet. It was awarded to eminent members of Soviet society, the military leadership and foreign members of the international communist and labour movements.

Medal Statute 
The Jubilee Medal "In Commemoration of the 100th Anniversary of the Birth of Vladimir Ilyich Lenin" was established by decree of the Presidium of the Supreme Soviet of the USSR on behalf of the joint resolutions of the republican, territorial and regional Party offices, bodies of government and trade unions, orders of the Minister of Defence, of the Minister of Internal Affairs, of the Chairman of the State Security Committee of the Council of Ministers, of the Commanders of the Armed Forces of the USSR, commanders of military districts, groups of forces, air defence districts and fleets.  It was produced and awarded under three official designations, one civilian, one military, the last for award to foreigners.  Each is distinguishable from the other by the awards' full names.  The civilian award was called The Jubilee Medal "For Valiant Labour – In Commemoration of the 100th Anniversary of the Birth of Vladimir Ilyich Lenin", the military award was called The Jubilee Medal "For Military Valour – In Commemoration of the 100th Anniversary of the Birth of Vladimir Ilyich Lenin", the award to foreigners bore the award's basic designation.

For Valiant Labour
The Jubilee Medal "For Valiant Labour – In Commemoration of the 100th Anniversary of the Birth of Vladimir Ilyich Lenin" was awarded to highly skilled senior workers, farmers, specialists of the national economy, employees of public institutions and public organizations, scientists and cultural figures, who displayed the highest examples of work in preparation for the anniversary of Lenin; to those who took an active part in the struggle for the establishment of Soviet power, or to protect the homeland, or who have made a significant contribution to their work in the building of socialism in the USSR, who helped the party to educate the younger generation by their personal example and social activities.

For Military Valour
The Jubilee Medal "For Military Valour – In Commemoration of the 100th Anniversary of the Birth of Vladimir Ilyich Lenin" was awarded to soldiers of the Soviet Army, sailors of the Navy, troops of the Ministry of Internal Affairs, troops of the State Security Committee of the Council of Ministers of the USSR, who displayed excellent performance in combat and political training, good results in the management and maintenance of combat readiness in preparation for the anniversary of Lenin.

For Foreign Leaders
The (basic) Jubilee Medal "In Commemoration of the 100th Anniversary of the Birth of Vladimir Ilyich Lenin" was awarded to foreign leaders of the international communist and labour movement and other progressive activists abroad.

The Jubilee Medal "In Commemoration of the 100th Anniversary of the Birth of Vladimir Ilyich Lenin" is worn on the left breast and when worn with orders and medals of the Soviet Union, placed above them but below the "Gold Star" medal of Hero of the Soviet Union and/or the gold medal "Hammer and Sickle" of Hero of Socialist Labour, in their absence, in their place.  When not worn, the ribbon of the medal should be located immediately after the ribbon of the Medal "For Distinguished Labour" in the ribbon bar. If worn in the presence or Orders or medals of the Russian Federation, the latter have precedence.

Each medal came with an attestation of award, this attestation came in the form of a small 8 cm by 11 cm cardboard booklet bearing the award's name, the recipient's particulars and an official stamp and signature on the inside.

Medal Description 
The Jubilee Medal "In Commemoration of the 100th Anniversary of the Birth of Vladimir Ilyich Lenin" was a 32mm in diameter circular brass medal. All three variants, civilian, military and for award to foreigners shared the basic design.  On a matte finished obverse, the polished left profile of Vladimir Ilyich Lenin over the relief dates "1870 – 1970".  The reverse bore at its center the horizontal relief inscription on four lines "TO COMMEMORATE THE 100th ANNIVERSARY OF V.I. LENIN", above the inscription, the relief image of the hammer and sickle, below the inscription, the relief image of a small five pointed star.  The variant to Soviet civilians also bore the relief inscription along the upper medal circumference "FOR VALIANT LABOUR", the military variant bore the relief inscription along the upper medal circumference "FOR MILITARY VALOUR", on the award to foreigners, these inscriptions were omitted.

The Jubilee Medal "In Commemoration of the 100th Anniversary of the Birth of Vladimir Ilyich Lenin" was secured by a ring through the medal suspension loop to a small 29mm wide by 25mm high rectangular mount covered by a 24mm wide red silk moiré ribbon with 2mm yellow edge stripes and two 1mm yellow central stripes separated by 2mm.

Recipients 

The individuals below were all recipients of the Jubilee Medal "In Commemoration of the 100th Anniversary of the Birth of Vladimir Ilyich Lenin"

Soviet recipients "For Valiant Labour" 
 Cellist and conductor Mstislav Rostropovich
 Physicist Alexander Prokhorov
 Businessman, politician and statesman Viktor Chernomyrdin
 Politician and statesman Mikhail Fradkov
 Poet Rimma Fyodorovna Kazakova
 Cosmonaut Vitaly Ivanovich Sevastyanov
 Test pilot Vladimir Ilyushin
 Surgeon Grigory Sarkisovich Grigoryants
 Politician Vladimir Dolgikh
 Mezzo-soprano opera singer Zara Aleksandrova Dolukhanova
 Politician and economist Sopubek Begaliev
 Actress Elina Bystritskaya
 Politician Kamil Iskhakov
 Cosmonaut Aleksei Stanislavovich Yeliseyev
 Ballerina Olga Vasiliyevna Lepeshinskaya
 Tatar composer and pianist Röstäm Möxämmätxaci ulı Yaxin
 Georgian linguist and philologist Akaki Gavrilovich Shanidze
 First President of the Russian Federation Boris Nikolayevich Yeltsin
 Rocket scientist Peter Dmitrievich Grushin
 Filmmaker Marlen Martynovich Khutsiev
 Azerbaijani ophthalmologist Sona Akhundova-Bagirbekova
 Ukrainian physicist Halyna Puchkivska
 Seamstress Lyudmila Byakova
 Master builder Zukhra Valeeva

Soviet recipients "For Military Valour" 
 Marshal of the Soviet Union Georgy Zhukov
 Sniper captain Vasily Zaytsev
 Marshal of the Soviet Union and Defence Minister Dmitriy Feodorovich Ustinov
 Ace fighter pilot and Marshal of Aviation Alexander Pokryshkin
 Marshal of the Soviet Union Vasily Chuikov
 Marshal of the Soviet Union Aleksandr Vasilevsky
 Marshal of the Soviet Union Ivan Yakubovsky
 Marshal of the Soviet Union Ivan Konev
 Marshal of the Soviet Union Pyotr Koshevoy
 Admiral Vladimir Tributs
 Marshal of the Soviet Union Semyon Mikhailovich Budyonny
 Former Russian Interior Minister Viktor Fyodorovich Yerin
 Ballistics specialist Colonel Ivan Fedorovich Ladyga
 Lieutenant Colonel Polina Vladimirovna Gelman
 Admiral of the Fleet of the Soviet Union Alexei Ivanovich Sorokin

Foreign recipients 
 General and later President Wojciech Jaruzelski (Poland)
 General Stanislav Poplavsky (People's Republic of Poland)
 Politician and revolutionary Raúl Castro (Cuba)
 Politician and Minister of State Security Erich Mielke (East Germany)
 Politician and Party First Secretary Walter Ulbricht (East Germany)
 General and Minister of Defence Heinz Kessler (East Germany)
 Political activist, scholar and author Angela Davis (US)

See also 

 Awards and decorations of the Soviet Union

References

External links 
 Legal Library of the USSR

Military awards and decorations of the Soviet Union
Civil awards and decorations of the Soviet Union
Awards established in 1969
1969 establishments in the Soviet Union
1991 disestablishments in the Soviet Union
Vladimir Lenin